Ganga Water Lift Project (GWLP) is a multi-phase drinking water project in Bihar, India. It is the ambitious project of Chief Minister of Bihar, Nitish Kumar to supply safe drinking water  to the water-alarmed towns like Gaya, Rajgir and Nawada, located in southern part of the state through pipeline by lifting water from Ganga river near Hathidah Ghat in Mokama in Patna district. The cost of this project is  2836 crore. Ganga Water Lift Project is part of Nitish Kumar’s ‘Jal-Jivan-Hariyali Abhiyan' which is aimed to minimize the bad effects of climate change.

Project details
The total length of pipeline that supply Ganga waters to three towns is 190.90 km. The Ganga water is lifted near Hathidah Ghat in Mokama and the pipeline  crosses alongside the national highways and state highways. The main pipeline  runs from Hathidah to Giriyak via Sarmera and Barbigha. From Giriyak, one pipeline goes to Rajgir, while another to Nawada. The water from Ganga is brought to Motnaje water treatment plant in Nawada district through a pipeline. In Gaya, urban development & housing department (UDHD) will ensure supply of water to the households through pipeline. The Public health & engineering department (PHED) will be responsible for Ganga water supply in Nawada. The length of the pipeline on Hathidah-Motnaje-Tetar-Abgilla pipe route is 150 km.

Third pipeline  goes to Manpur (near Gaya) via Vanganga, Tapovan and Jethia. A major water storage point is constructed near Manpur. Similar storage point is be constructed for other towns too. The project is completed in three phases. Ganga water will be supplied to Gaya, Bodhgaya and Rajgir in the first phase of the project. Nawada town would be covered in the second phase.

See also
 Kaleshwaram Lift Irrigation Project

References

Water treatment